The women's high jump at the 2015 World Championships in Athletics was held at the Beijing National Stadium on 27 and 29 August.

It took 1.92 to make the finals, and eight competitors made it cleanly.  In the finals, only eight cleared 1.92; Ana Šimić, Doreen Amata, and Levern Spencer, who had jumped it in qualification, missed three times.  1.95 lost Jeanelle Scheper and Eleanor Patterson, but the remaining six all made it through three heights to 1.99.  Two-time champion Blanka Vlašić looked like her dominant self from six years earlier with a large clearance at 2.01, but she had one failure at 1.92.  Mariya Kuchina, whose best achievement had been a tie for the World Indoor Championship, cleared it next as a personal best, and she was still clean.  The 2012 Olympic champion Anna Chicherova cleared it on her second attempt.  Kamila Lićwinko (the other half of that tie), returning bronze medalist Ruth Beitia, and Marie-Laurence Jungfleisch were unable to make 2.01, so the medals were settled.  The bar went up to 2.03, but nobody could make it, so the results were decided by the count back.  Chicherova needed two attempts at the winning height, so she finished third.  Of the two who made it their first time, that mistake earlier in the competition gave Vlašić another silver medal (her fourth in major competition), while Kuchina's perfect series was rewarded with the gold medal.

Records
Prior to the competition, the records were as follows:

Qualification standards

Schedule

Results

Qualification
Qualification: 1.94 m (Q) or at least 12 best performers (q).

Final
The final started at 18:30.

References

High jump
High jump at the World Athletics Championships
2015 in women's athletics